The Hammonasset River is formed about  southeast of Durham, Connecticut along a gully on the north end of Bunker Hill at about a half mile northeast of the junction of Route 148 and Bunker Hill Road. This is a scenic river run with mostly flat and quickwater, but with a few Class I-II whitewater areas.

The Hammonasset were a tribe of Algonquian Native Americans who had their "digging grounds" in this part of Connecticut, from the west bank of the Connecticut River to the Hammonasset River along the coast. The act of the Connecticut General Court, May 10, 1666, that established New London County mentioned as the county's western bounds "Homonoscet Plantation", which was settled by the English in 1663, now Killingworth.  The name was also spelled "Homonoscitt" in some records.

See also
Genesee Tunnel
List of rivers of Connecticut

References

External links 
Connecticut Explorer's Guide - paddling map of the Hammonasset River
 https://web.archive.org/web/20130927185519/http://www.cslib.org/tribes.htm - Connecticut Native American Tribes

Tourist attractions in New Haven County, Connecticut
Tourist attractions in Middlesex County, Connecticut
Madison, Connecticut
Durham, Connecticut
Estuaries of Connecticut
Rivers of Middlesex County, Connecticut
Rivers of New Haven County, Connecticut
Rivers of Connecticut